Kirkaldy Spur is a rock spur at the northwest side of Coxcomb Peak in the northwestern part of the Shipton Ridge, in the Allan Hills of Oates Land, Antarctica. It was reconnoitered by the New Zealand Antarctic Research Programme Allan Hills Expedition (1964) who gave the name after J.F. Kirkaldy, professor of geology at Queen Mary College, London.

References

Ridges of Oates Land